The Night Watchman may refer to:

 The Night Watchman (1938 film), a Merrie Melodies cartoon
 The Night Watchman (2015 film), a French-Belgian film
 The Night Watchman (novel), a 2020 novel by Louise Erdrich
 The Night Watchman's Journal, aka The Night Watchmen, a 2014 South Korean television series
 Street Kings, a 2008 motion picture originally titled The Night Watchman

See also 
Nightwatchman (disambiguation)
The Nightwatchman, a solo project by American musician Tom Morello
Night Watch (disambiguation)
The Night Watchmen, a 2017 horror film